The fourth USS Uncas (YT-242) was United States Navy tug in commission from 1942 to 1946.

Career

World War II
Uncas was built by the Levingston Shipbuilding Company at Orange, Texas. She was in civilian service under the names Susan Moran and Southwind before the U.S. Navy acquired her on 21 March 1942 for use during World War II as USS Uncas (YT-242).  She was named for Uncas, a chief of the Mohegan tribe in Connecticut during the 17th Century.

Uncas operated actively as part of the Service Force, United States Atlantic Fleet, for the duration of the war.

Her most memorable service came in early November 1942, when she helped to defend Convoy SC-107 against German submarines as it crossed the North Atlantic Ocean from Halifax, Nova Scotia, Canada, to the United Kingdom.  She was awarded a battle star for this service.

Postwar career
Uncas was placed in an inactive status at Boston, Massachusetts, in March 1946. She was stricken from the Navy List in January 1947 and sold to private ownership on 16 May 1947.

Awards

American Campaign Medal with one battle star
European-African-Middle Eastern Campaign Medal
World War II Victory Medal

References

External links
 Photo gallery at navsource.org

Tugs of the United States Navy
Ships built in Orange, Texas
World War II auxiliary ships of the United States